Estradiol benzoate/estradiol dienanthate/testosterone enanthate benzilic acid hydrazone (EB/EDE/TEBH), sold under the brand names Climacteron, Lactimex, Lactostat, and Amenose, is an injectable combination medication of estradiol benzoate (EB), an estrogen, estradiol dienanthate (EDE), an estrogen, and testosterone enanthate benzilic acid hydrazone (TEBH), an androgen/anabolic steroid, which is used in menopausal hormone therapy for peri- and postmenopausal women and to suppress lactation in postpartum women. Clinical studies have assessed this formulation.

Climacteron and Amenose contained 1.0 mg EB, 7.5 mg EDE, and 150 mg TEBH (69 mg free testosterone) and was used to treat menopausal symptoms. They were administered by intramuscular injection typically once every 6 weeks but with a range of every 4 to 8 weeks or less frequently. Climacteron was marketed in Canada in 1961 but was withdrawn in this country in October 2005 due to risk of endometrial hyperplasia and cancer from unopposed estrogen exposure (i.e., no concomitant progestogen) as well as induction of supraphysiological testosterone levels.

Lactimex and Lactostat contained 6 mg EB, 15 mg EDE, and 300 mg TEBH in 2 mL of corn oil and were used to suppress lactation. They were administered as a single intramuscular injection after childbirth or during breastfeeding. They were previously available in Germany and Canada.

Estradiol and testosterone levels following a single intramuscular injection of EB/EDE/TEBH versus 10 mg estradiol valerate have been studied over 28 days.

See also
 List of combined sex-hormonal preparations

References

Abandoned drugs
Combined estrogen–androgen formulations